The 2014 Super Rugby Final, was played between the New South Wales Waratahs from Australia and the Crusaders from New Zealand on 2 August 2014. It was the 19th final in the Super Rugby competition's history and the fourth under the expanded 15-team format. The Waratahs had qualified in first place during the regular season, while the Crusaders had qualified in second place. Both teams hosted semi-final matches, with the Waratahs defeating fellow Australian team the Brumbies in Sydney and the Crusaders defeating South African team the Sharks in Christchurch. As the Waratahs had qualified higher, the final was held in Sydney.

The final attracted the Super Rugby record attendance of 61,823 to the ANZ Stadium.

Road to the final

The 2014 Super Rugby competition involved fifteen teams, five each from South Africa, Australia and New Zealand. The 2014 season was the 19th year of the competition, and the fourth in the expanded 15 team format (12 teams competed between 1996 and 2005, before increasing to 14 between 2006 and 2010). The 2014 competition began on 15 February with the regular season consisting of 120 matches over twenty-two weeks. Each team played the others from their own conference (both home and away), plus four out of five teams from the other two countries (two at home and two away in each case). The top six teams after the regular season advanced to the finals.

The Waratahs finished top of the Australian conference and topped the overall standings, with twelve wins and just four losses during the season (to the Brumbies, Western Force, Blues, and Sharks). The Crusaders finished top of the New Zealand conference with eleven wins and five losses—to the Hurricanes (twice), Chiefs, Blues, and Sharks. The Sharks won the South African conference, and the Brumbies, Chiefs and Highlanders filled the remaining three places as the next top finishers during the regular season.

The Brumbies hosted the Chiefs in Canberra in the first qualifying final, while the Highlanders traveled to Durban to play the Sharks. The Brumbies and Chiefs scored four tries apiece in the first qualifier, but the Brumbies prevailed with Christian Lealiifano successful with five kicks from eight off the tee in their 32–30 victory. The second qualifier was also a close match with the Sharks and Highlanders scoring three tries each, but the Sharks came from behind with two penalty kicks by François Steyn in the final 6 minutes to win by 31–27.

For the semi-finals, the Sharks flew to Christchurch to play the Crusaders and the Brumbies travelled to Sydney to play the Waratahs. Both games were won by a clear margin in the end but the run of play in each match was substantially different. The Crusaders scored five tries to nil to defeat the Sharks by 38–6. The Brumbies, by contrast, were not shut out of the game until Waratahs' fly-half Bernard Foley scored ten points in last seven minutes to secure victory for his side by 26–8.

Final match

Match details

References

Final
2014
2014 in Australian rugby union
2014 in New Zealand rugby union
Crusaders (rugby union) matches
New South Wales Waratahs matches
Sports competitions in Sydney